Bertrade or Bertrada may refer to:

 Bertrada of Prüm, Frankish princess, co-founder and benefactor of the Prüm Abbey
 Bertrada of Laon, queen of the Franks, wife of Pippin III, granddaughter of the above
 Bertrade de Montfort, daughter of Simon I de Montfort and Agnes, Countess of Évreux